Rozdilna Raion is a raion (district) in Odesa Oblast of Ukraine. Its administrative center is the city of Rozdilna. Population: 

On 17 July 2020, as part of the administrative reform of Ukraine, the number of raions of Odesa Oblast was reduced to seven, and the area of Rozdilna Raion was significantly expanded.  The January 2020 estimate of the raion population was 

According to the 2001 Ukrainian census the population was 78% Ukrainian, 14% Russian, 5% Moldovan, 1% Bulgarian, and 1% Belarusian. 

The urban-type settlement of Lymanske and the village of Kuchurhan are located at the western edge of the district along the border with Transnistria in Moldova.

Administrative division

Current
After the reform in July 2020, the raion consisted of 9 hromadas:
 Lymanske settlement hromada with the administration in the urban-type settlement of Lymanske, retained from Rozdilna Raion;
 Novoborysivka Hromada
 Rozdilna urban hromada with the administration in the city of Rozdilna, retained from Rozdilna Raion;
 Stepanivka rural romada with the administration in the selo of Stepanivka, retained from Rozdilna Raion;
 Tsebrykove Hromada
 Velyka Mykhailivka Hromada
 Velykoploske Hromada
 Zatyshshia settlement hromada
 Zakharivka settlement hromada

Before 2020

Before the 2020 reform, the raion consisted of one hromada, 
 Lymanske settlement hromada with the administration in Lymanske;
 Rozdilna urban hromada with the administration in Rozdilna.
 Stepanivka rural hromada with the administration in Stepanivka,

References

External links 
  Rozdilnianskyi Raion
  Tourism as catalyst of rural economic development (Rozdilna Raion)
 Раздельная криминальная

 
Raions of Odesa Oblast
Moldova–Ukraine border
1930 establishments in Ukraine